Zugdidi (or ზუგიდი) is a city in the western Georgian historical province of Samegrelo (Mingrelia). It is situated in the north-west of that province. The city is located 318 kilometres west of Tbilisi, 30 km from the Black Sea coast and 30 km from the Egrisi Range, at an elevation of 100–110 metres above sea level. Zugdidi is the capital of the Samegrelo-Zemo Svaneti region, which combines Samegrelo (Mingrelia) and upper part of Svaneti, and the center of the Zugdidi Municipality within.

The city serves as a residence of Metropolitan of Zugdidi and Tsaishi Eparchy of the Georgian Apostolic Autocephalous Orthodox Church.

Etymology
The name "Zugdidi" (ზუგდიდი) first appears in the 17th century. An alternative version of the name recorded in old sources is "Zubdidi" (ზუბდიდი) with same meaning from Megrelian. Local Georgian (Megrelian) residents of the historical provinces of Megrelia and Abkhazia also use "Zugidi" (ზუგიდი), which is a shortened form. The name was given to the town because of a hill situated in the eastern part of the city, where some small remains of an ancient fortress are still visible.

History
Historically Zugdidi was a capital of the Principality of Mingrelia (Odishi) until 1867, when the principality was abolished by the Russian Empire. After then Zugdidi was an administrative center of Zugdidi Uyezd as a part of the Kutais Governorate until 1918, when it became a part of the Democratic Republic of Georgia. From 1930 the center of the Zugdidi Raion of the Georgian Soviet Socialist Republic and then Independent Georgia (from 1991). 

Between 17–19th centuries, Zugdidi was one of the important political and cultural center of Mingrelia and whole Georgia. A famous Georgian medieval epic poem The Knight in the Panther's Skin has been rewritten by Mamuka Tavakalashvili here at the court of Prince Levan II Dadiani in 1646.

During the Crimean War (1853–1856) Ottoman forces with Omar Pasha seized Zugdidi in 1855. At the end of the 1855 and beginning of 1856 city was liberated by Mingrelian Militia commanded by Major General Prince Grigol Dadiani. By the order of Iskender Pasha Ottomans plundered, burnt and destroyed the whole city, especially palaces and botanical garden. During the Russian Empire, the city was the administrative center of the Zugdidi Uyezd of the Kutaisi Governorate. Many buildings were heavily damaged during the Georgian Civil War 1992–1993 as well. 
 
In 1993, there were located administration of the first President of Georgia Zviad Gamsakhurdia and the Supreme Council of the Republic of Georgia as well.

Architecture and landmarks

Dadiani Palace 

Dadiani Palace, built in the 19th century, was home to the final ruling family of the Principality of Samegrelo. The complex includes the palace of Ekaterine Dadiani of Samegrelo; a residence for her son, Niko Dadiani; a monastery; and what is now the Zugdidi Botanical Garden. Today, the palace operates as a museum and is open to visitors. It underwent renovations from 2015 to 2018.

Botanical Garden 

Zugdidi Botanical Garden was established in the 19th century by the Prince of Mingrelia David Dadiani and Queen Ekaterine, near the residential palaces. Currently, the garden is a branch of Tbilisi Central Botanical Garden and is administered by the Georgian Academy of Sciences. The garden covers 26 hectares.

Shalva Dadiani Zugdidi State Academic Drama Theater
This theater's first performance, Molière's Le médecin malgré lui (The Doctor Despite Himself), was staged on 11 April 1869 by Anton Purtseladze. The Drama Theater was founded in 1932. in 1959 the theater was named after the famous Georgian novelist and theatrical actor Shalva Dadiani (1874–1959).

Other landmarks 

 Chakvinji fortress
 Tsaishi cathedral

Climate
Zugdidi has a humid subtropical climate (Cfa) under the Köppen climate classification.

Demography and population
Historically Zugdidi is known as a distinctly mono-ethnic city with a vast majority of Georgians. By the 2002 state census 98.97% (166,039) of its total population (167,760) were ethnic Georgians (for both city and municipality).

In the second half of the 1850s, due to the short Ottoman occupation, the town population decreased from 2000 to 800.

The 1950s-1970s were an important period for Zugdidi's development, which affected the growth of population, while the last 20-year growth was mainly caused by refugee displacement. After the Russian-Georgian war in Abkhazia (1992-1993) a large number of internally displaced peoples from Abkhazia were forced to move to Zugdidi. As a result of this, according to the 2002 state census, Zugdidi became the fifth most populous city in Georgia, ahead of Sokhumi, Poti, and Gori. As of the 2014 national census, the population of Zugdidi decreased to 42,998 inhabitants, making it Georgia's sixth most populous city after Gori.

Historic population of Zugdidi:

Education
Zugdidi is a regional center of education. Institutes of higher education are: 

Shota Meskhia State Teaching University – the main institution of higher education founded in 2007 on the basis of Zugdidi Branch of Ivane Javakhishvili Tbilisi State University, Zugdidi Professional Lyceum and Senaki Agro-economic College. The university has three faculties of Humanitarian, Business Administration and Law and Health. 
Zugdidi Teaching University European Academy, founded in 1991

Besides this Zugdidi has 13 public and 3 private schools, as well as kindergartens.
Alexander Gurtskaya Gymnasium – GG – one more place of interest and unique educational space. Was founded in 2011, on the basis of Presidential Decree instead of former Public School No.7. Today, GG is an innovative educational environment where each individual has a wide selection, capability and motivation of intellectual, physical and spiritual development and wonderful opportunities for achieving success in the global competitive society. The Gymnasium welcomes its students and guests with its unique, original facade, which is made as randomly-spaced books on the shelves.

Library tradition in Zugdidi dates back to the reign of Prince (Mtavari) David Dadiani (1812–1853) of Mingrelia, who collected a large number of handwritten and printed books. The first public library in Zugdidi was established in 1887. After this, in 1899 new reading-room was rearranged, which turned into library in 1912 with its own building. Currently, the library is called Zugdidi City Municipal Library.

Annual events

Vlakernoba
The main annual event in Zugdidi is Vlakernoba ( - The day of the Blachernae's Virgin Mary) - an Orthodox Christian feast celebrated every year, on July 15. On this day, the robe of the Blessed Virgin Mary is taken from the Tower of Virgin of the Queen Palace (now a museum), where it is kept, to the Cathedral of the Blachernae Icon of the Mother of God. During the feast thousands of the faithful from all over the world are able to venerate the holy relic upon the conclusion of the Divine Liturgy.

From 2012, during the event, the holy robe was carried into the new cathedral of Iberian Theotokos.
Vlakernoba is celebrated since the 1990s.

Zugdidoba
Zugdidoba ( - the day of Zugdidi) is a newly reestablished public festival, featuring various cultural, sport and educational events in Zugdidi, mostly in October. The festival is managed both by Zugdidi Municipal City Hall and Zugdidi Municipality Government.

Sports

The main association football team in the city is FC Dinamo Zugdidi founded in 1919. Other, amateur, football clubs are FC Mglebi Zugdidi and FC Odishi 1919. American Football Club "Western bad boys"

Notable people

 Niko I Dadiani (1847–1903), Prince of Mingrelia
 Salome Dadiani (1848–1913),  Georgian princess, the only sister of Niko Dadiani
 Andria Dadiani (1850–1910), Georgian nobleman and a chess player
 Otar Patsatsia (1929–2021), 3rd Prime Minister of Georgia (1993–1995)
 Nona Gaprindashvili (1941–), chess player, the sixth women's world chess champion (1962–1978), first female Grandmaster 
 Otar Gabelia (1953–), retired football player, goalkeeper of FC Dinamo Tbilisi and Soviet Union national football team 
 Davit Narmania (1979–), former Mayor of Tbilisi, the capital of Georgia
 Bacho Akhalaia (1980–), politician who was Minister of Internal Affairs of Georgia 
 Davit Kiria (1988–), Georgian kickboxer who competes in the Lightweight division
 Ika Meporia (1989–), professional footballer

See also
 Zugdidi Municipality
 Dadiani Palaces History and Architectural Museum
 Zugdidi Botanical Garden
 Samegrelo-Zemo Svaneti

References

External links

Website of Zugdidi Municipal City Hall
Website of City Council of Zugdidi Municipality

Cities and towns in Samegrelo-Zemo Svaneti
Kutaisi Governorate
Mingrelia